Novodyurtyukeyevo (Yañı Dürtekäy) is a rural locality (a village) in Seytyakovsky Selsoviet, Baltachevsky District, Bashkortostan, Russia. The population was 57 as of 2010. There is 1 street.

Geography 
Novodyurtyukeyevo is located 17 km southwest of Starobaltachevo (the district's administrative centre) by road. Seytyakovo is the nearest rural locality.

References 

Rural localities in Baltachevsky District